Moron distigma is a species of beetle in the family Cerambycidae, and the only species in the genus Moron.

References

Pteropliini
Beetles described in 1858